The Hofbräuhaus am Platzl is a beer hall in Munich, Bavaria, Germany, originally built in 1589 by Bavarian Duke Maximilian I as an extension of the Staatliches Hofbräuhaus in München brewery. The general public was admitted in 1828 by Ludwig I. The building was completely remodeled in 1897 by Max Littmann when the brewery moved to the suburbs. All of the rooms except the historic beer hall ("Schwemme") were destroyed in the World War II bombings. The reopening of the Festival Hall in 1958 marked the end of the post-war restoration work.

History
William V, Duke of Bavaria found the beer in Munich bad so he imported beer from Saxony. He eventually asked his royal court to find a solution. A local brewery followed in 1589.. It is also a place in where Nazi Germany dictator Adolf Hitler made a speech founding the National Socialist German Workers' Party, or the Nazi Party.

Features

The restaurant comprises most of the Hofbräuhaus am Platzl, which also includes a ballroom and outdoor Wirtsgarten. Its menu features such traditional favorites of Bavarian cuisine as Brezn (soft pretzel), Obatzda (cheese dip), Hax'n, and sausages such as Bratwurst and Weisswurst. Brews include Helles and Dunkles served in a Maß, Weißbier, and wine.

Munich's largest tourist attraction after the Oktoberfest, the Hofbräuhaus am Platzl is also frequented by locals, many of whom keep their personal steins stored there. During regular hours traditional Bavarian music is played. The famous Hofbräuhaus song (Hofbräuhaus-Lied), composed in 1935 by Wilhelm "Wiga" Gabriel, goes: "In München steht ein Hofbräuhaus, eine, zwei, g'suffa! ("There's a Hofbräuhaus in Munich—one, two, down the hatch!" in the local dialect).

Innkeepers 
 1885–1896: Martin Ammerloher
 1897–1906: Joseph Wittmann
 1906–1919: Karl Mittermüller
 1919–1930: Hans Parzer (during Hyperinflation in the Weimar Republic)
 1930–1945: Hans Bacherl (during Nazi rule in Germany and WWII)
 1945–1950: Valentin Emmert (during Post-war)
 1950–1960: Franz Trimborn (during completion of reconstruction)
 1960–1970: Toni Steiner
 1970–1980: Hans Glanegger 
 1980–2004: Michael and Gerda Sperger
 2004–present: Wolfgang and Michael Sperger

Famous patrons
Wolfgang Amadeus Mozart lived around the block from the beer hall in the late eighteenth century. In a poem he wrote, Mozart claimed to have written the opera Idomeneo after several visits to the Hofbräuhaus fortified him for the task. In the nineteenth century, most of the breweries in Munich, including the Hofbräuhaus, were converted into large beer halls, restaurants, and entertainment centers with large, cavernous meeting rooms for weddings, concerts, and plays. In the period just before World War One, Vladimir Lenin lived in Munich and reportedly visited the Hofbräuhaus on a regular basis. In 1919, the Munich Communist government set up headquarters in the beer hall, and in February 1920 Adolf Hitler and the National Socialists held their first meeting in the Festsaal, the Festival Room, on the third floor. 

On 24th February 1920, Hitler presented the Nazi Party's Twenty Five Point Program in the Hofbräuhaus. On that day, the Nazi party held a large public meeting and whilst Hitler was speaking, the meeting erupted into a melee. There was a massive fight between the Social Democrat and Communist opponents of the Nazi party, whose thugs eventually won the melee. Hitler managed to finish his address, notwithstanding the chaos of smashed tables and chairs and hurled beer mugs all about him. On 4 November 1921 the Hofbräuhaus was also the birthplace of the later feared Nazi street fighting organization, the Sturmabteilungen, or SA. 

After Munich's world-famous Oktoberfest (where the Hofbräu has one of the largest beer tents), the Hofbräuhaus am Platzl is Munich's most outstanding tourist attraction and historical monument. Other famous visitors include Marcel Duchamp, Thomas Wolfe, Louis Armstrong, Mikhail Gorbachev, NASA astronauts, and past American Presidents John F. Kennedy and George H. W. Bush.

See also
 Hofbräu-Festzelt
 Hofbräukeller

References

External links

 Official Website
 Old Town City Panorama—Panoramic view at the Hofbräuhaus am Platzl
 Virtual Tourist articles

Beer gardens in Germany
Buildings and structures completed in 1607
Buildings and structures in Munich
Culture in Munich
Drinking establishments in Germany
German beer culture
Historicist architecture in Munich
Tourist attractions in Munich